Strategic energy management (SEM) is a  set of processes for business energy management. SEM is often deployed via programs that target the businesses or other organizations within a utility territory or a government area. SEM is codified in the ISO 50001 standard for energy management systems.

Energy benefits 
The main goal of SEM is to help a company achieve continuous improvement in its energy performance over a longer-term period. Some energy benefits of SEM include reduced energy consumption through improved energy efficiency and energy conservation, improved peak demand management and reduced demand charges, decreased overall energy cost, reduced energy costs,  greenhouse gas (GHG) emissions and improved reliability through integration of distributed energy resources (e.g. onsite renewables, localized energy storage, combined heat and power), and improved electrical price stability and reduced GHG emissions through integration of long-term renewable energy contracts.

Non-energy benefits 
Although often focused on energy management, SEM also supports other goals, including: reducing downtime and increasing productivity through improved maintenance practices, reducing  and other air emissions through reduced on-site fuel combustion (through efficiency or through beneficial electrification), and improved employee productivity through increased employee morale.

Core elements 
Most companies take several years to develop all the elements of SEM. The core or minimum elements of SEM for achieving the goal and benefits just described include management commitment to long-term energy performance goals, energy planning and implementation, and system for measuring and reporting energy performance.

Current activities 
SEM Collaboratives
Regional SEM collaboratives have met in the Northwestern and Northeastern United States for several years, with interest expressed in other regions for similar collaborative forums.

The first North American SEM Summit was conducted in Denver Colorado on August 15, 2017, with representatives from across the United States and Canada.

Common services 
While organizations can implement SEM on their own, many have found value in leveraging SEM specialists or SEM-based programs.

Private companies
Private companies provide SEM-based services to their customers as a dedicated consulting engagement.  Other companies integrate SEM concepts into their more traditional energy engineering, energy planning, or energy project implementations.

Energy utilities
Energy utilities in the U.S. and Canada often deploy dedicated SEM programs or deploy SEM components within other programs. These utilities deploy SEM for multiple reasons increased energy savings to support utility Demand Side Management (DSM) goals, measured in electrical, gas, or other energy savings, increased customer motivation to pursue energy saving opportunities (with less required utility outreach/marketing), reduced peak demand to address constraints in generation and/or transmission/distribution, and increased long-term customer satisfaction

The target customers for these programs are typically larger organizations, often manufacturers or larger building environments such as hospitals, water utilities, and universities.

Some utility SEM programs work with customers on an individual basis, and some provide training and coaching to groups of companies, often referred to as cohorts. The cohort approach tends to be more cost-effective for the utility, since at least some of the coach/trainer's time can serve several customers at once. In addition, the cohort can provide positive peer pressure for participants to take action and save more energy.

Government agencies
Government agencies around the world often deploy SEM programs to drive adoption of ISO 50001, to increase competitiveness of the businesses within their borders, and/or to address climate priorities.

ISO 50001 
ISO 50001 codifies SEM by establishing universal requirements for management systems for energy (EnMSs).  ISO 50001 is aligned to other management system standards for quality and environmental impact.  It includes requirements for management participation, objectives, monitoring and measurement, and several other elements.

References 

Energy conservation
Energy efficiency
Strategic management